The most popular Latin pop songs in 2000, ranked by radio airplay audience impressions and measured by Nielsen BDS.

References

United States Latin Pop Airplay
2000
2000 in Latin music